Raibag is a large village in the southern state of Karnataka, India. It is located in Raybag taluk of Belagavi district of Karnataka.

Demographics
 India census, Raybag (Rural) had a population of  10732, Comprising 5548 males and 5184 females.

History
In ancient days Raybag was called as Poobaagi means hoovina baagi (flowers place). The Ratta empire ruled Poobaagi for several centuries. Somanath temple, Narasimha temple and Jain basadi are historical places. Rajaditya was famous a mathematician of Poobaagi.

See also
 Belgaum
 Districts of Karnataka

References

External links
 http://Belgaum.nic.in/

Villages in Belagavi district